Ernest Utah "Ernie" Stevens (born December 31, 1993) is an American former pair skater. With his skating partner, Caitlin Fields, he is the 2015 U.S. national junior champion and placed fifth at the 2015 World Junior Championships.

Personal life 
Stevens was born on December 31, 1993, in Louisville, Kentucky. After graduating from Trinity High School, he studied strategic communications and advertising at Butler University in Indianapolis, Indiana.

Career

Early years 
Stevens began learning to skate in Louisville, as a seven-year-old interested in hockey, and began training in Indiana at age 13. He teamed up with Christina Zaitsev in 2009. The pair won the novice title at the 2013 U.S. Championships and competed at three ISU Junior Grand Prix events. They were coached by her father, Serguei Zaitsev, in Carmel, Indiana.

Partnership with Fields 

Stevens teamed up with Caitlin Fields in late August 2014. Making their international debut, they won the junior pairs' title at the Toruń Cup in January 2015 in Toruń, Poland. At the 2015 U.S. Championships, held later that month in Greensboro, North Carolina, Fields/Stevens ranked first in both segments of the junior pairs' competition and won gold by a margin of 4.57 points over the silver medalists, Chelsea Liu / Brian Johnson. In March, they placed 7th in the short program, 4th in the free skate, and fifth overall at the World Junior Championships in Tallinn, Estonia. Serguei Zaitsev coached the pair at the Carmel Ice Skadium in Carmel, Indiana.

Fields/Stevens moved up to the senior level for the 2015–2016 season. They placed 8th at the 2015 CS Golden Spin of Zagreb, held in December in Croatia, and 11th at the 2016 U.S. Championships, held in January in Saint Paul, Minnesota.

Fields sustained a concussion in November 2016, resulting in the pair's withdrawal from the 2017 U.S. Championships.

Programs

With Fields

With Zaitsev

Competitive highlights 
CS: Challenger Series; JGP: Junior Grand Prix

With Fields

With Zaitsev

References

External links 
 

1993 births
American male pair skaters
Living people
Sportspeople from Louisville, Kentucky
20th-century American people
21st-century American people